is a 2006 Japanese drama film written and directed by Kon Ichikawa. It is a remake of his own 1976 film The Inugami Family, and would prove to be Ichikawa's final film. A few minutes' footage of Ichikawa at work directing can be seen in the 2006 documentary The Kon Ichikawa Story. The film was entered into the 29th Moscow International Film Festival.

Cast
 Kōji Ishizaka as Kosuke Kindaichi
 Nanako Matsushima as Tamayo Nonomiya
 Kikunosuke Onoe(尾上菊之助) as Sukekiyo Inugami / Shizuma Aonuma
 Sumiko Fuji as Matsuko Inugami
 Keiko Matsuzaka as Takeko Inugami
 Hisako Manda as Umeko Inugami
 Shingo Katsurayama as Suketake Inugami
  as Suketomo Inugami
 Yukijiro Hotaru as Kōkichi Inugami
  as Saruzō
 Saburo Ishikura as Fujisaki Kanshiki-ka-in
  as Senba Keiji
 Kyoko Fukada as Haru
Tamao Nakamura
Mitsuko Kusabue
Hideji Ōtaki as  Ōyama
Kōki Mitanias Nasu Hotel owner
Takeshi Katō as Detective Todoroki
Atsuo Nakamura as Furudate Kyozo

References

External links
 

2006 films
2006 drama films
Japanese drama films
2000s Japanese-language films
Remakes of Japanese films
Films directed by Kon Ichikawa
Films with screenplays by Kon Ichikawa
2000s Japanese films